Adhemarius donysa is a species of moth in the family Sphingidae. It was described by Herbert Druce in 1889, and is known from Mexico.

Description

Biology 
There are probably at least two generations per year.

References

Adhemarius
Moths described in 1889
Moths of Central America